The 2012 V8SuperTourer season is a motor racing championship for touring cars held in New Zealand. It began on 17 February at Hampton Downs Motorsport Park and ended on the 25 November at Powerbuilt Tools Raceway, Ruapuna after seven rounds. All cars use a chassis built by Paul Ceprnich of Pace Innovations in Australia, and are powered a Mosler 7-litre engine.

While the chassis and engines are the same (to provide a level playing field and hopefully allow the best drivers to succeed due to talent, not equipment), the cars can 'wear' body panels from any suitable model. So far, cars have appeared as either the Ford Falcon or Holden Commodore, but the chassis are a generic enough shape that a manufacturer such as Toyota or BMW could likely fit their bodywork to a Supertourer chassis and race as Lexus or 5 Series model.

16 cars were confirmed to run in the inaugural season. The V8SuperTourer also confirmed an exclusive broadcasting deal with TV3 to screen all of the races live on the Gillette Motorsport show.

Teams and drivers
The following teams and drivers competed during the 2012 V8SuperTourer season.

Notes:
 – Scott Harrison was Paul Manuell's co-driver for Round 5 at Taupo, and John Penny was driving with Manuell at Pukekohe and Ruapuna.

Calendar
The 2012 V8SuperTourer season consisted of seven rounds. The final three rounds were run under an endurance format akin to that run in the V8 Supercar series in Australia.

Endurance Series

Championship standings

Drivers Championship

Sprint Championship

Endurance Championship

See also
V8SuperTourer

References

External links
 V8SuperTourers New Zealand 
 V8SuperTourer News on Speedstuff

V8SuperTourer